The Impérial was a first-rate 118-gun ship of the line of the French Navy, of the Océan type, designed by Jacques-Noël Sané and built by François Poncet.

She was begun at Toulon in 1810 and completed in 1812. She was the French flagship during the action of 5 November 1813.

She was renamed Royal Louis in April 1814 following the downfall of the First Empire, but resumed the name Impérial in March 1815 when Napoléon returned to France. After the Hundred Days and the restitution of Louis XVIII, she was again renamed Royal Louis in July 1815, being disarmed in June 1816. She was condemned in March 1825 and broken up later that year.

Ships of the line of the French Navy
Océan-class ships of the line
1811 ships
Ships built in France